Muhamad Faisal bin Abdul Manap (born 1975) is a Singaporean politician who has been serving as Vice-Chairman of the Worker's Party since 2016. He has been the Member of Parliament (MP) representing the Kaki Bukit division of Aljunied GRC since 2011.

Education
Faisal attended Eunos Primary School and Telok Kurau Secondary School before graduating from Singapore Polytechnic in 1995 with a diploma in civil and structural engineering.

He subsequently went on to complete a Bachelor of Science degree in psychology at Monash University in 2005.

Political career

Faisal first entered politics during the 2011 general election as the ethnic minority candidate in a five-member Workers' Party team contesting in Aljunied GRC against the governing People's Action Party (PAP). The Workers' Party team won with 54.72% of the vote, making it the first time in Singapore's electoral history an opposition party had won a general election in a GRC. Faisal thus became a Member of Parliament representing the Kaki Bukit ward of Aljunied GRC in the 12th Parliament on 9 May 2011. The Workers' Party has since retained its parliamentary seats in Aljunied GRC in the subsequent general elections and Faisal has continued serving as the Member of Parliament representing Kaki Bukit. 

Faisal is one of the party's five-member Worker's Party team along with Pritam Singh, Sylvia Lim, Gerald Giam and Leon Perera contesting the Aljunied GRC in the 2020 general election and retain back with 59.95% of the votes.

Parliamentary representation

Maintenance of Religious Harmony Act
During the debate over a parliamentary bill to amend the Maintenance of Religious Harmony Act, Faisal had a heated exchange with Home Affairs and Law Minister K. Shanmugam over the separation of religion from politics. Faisal stated that he did not fully agree with the principle of the separation of religion from politics. He argued that while people "shouldn't use religion for the benefit of politics", it is inevitable that religion and politics are intertwined in the formulation of policies.

Tudong issue
Since he had been elected to Parliament in 2011, Faisal had persistently raised the issue of allowing Muslim nurses and women in uniformed services to don the tudong in the course of their duty. In 2017, Minister-in-Charge of Muslim Affairs Masagos Zulkifli rebuked Faisal for "subtly and frequently needling" the Malay-Muslim community with this issue. Masagos said that such issues should not be discussed in Parliament since it has the potential to disrupt Singapore’s racial and religious harmony and that should be resolved behind closed doors instead. In 2021, Prime Minister Lee Hsien Loong announced that Muslim nurses in Singapore's public healthcare sector will be allowed to wear a tudung with their uniforms if they wish to.

Vice Chairman of the Workers' Party 
Faisal was elected Vice Chairman of the Workers' Party central executive committee (CEC) on 29 May 2016, taking over the position from Mohammed Rahizan Yaacob. His two-year term has been continuously renewed in subsequent CEC elections, with the last election held on 27 December 2020.

Views on homosexuality
In June 2014, Faisal was seen alongside campaign organisers and supporters at a Wear White campaign, an anti-LGBT movement in Singapore. Faisal clarified that he opposes homosexuality and Pink Dot SG and that he backed the movement in his personal capacity "as a Muslim individual".

References

External links 
Muhamad Faisal Manap on Parliament of Singapore
 
 

Members of the Parliament of Singapore
Workers' Party (Singapore) politicians
Monash University alumni
Living people
1975 births
Singaporean people of Malay descent
Singaporean Muslims